Eusabena is a genus of moths of the family Crambidae.

Species
Eusabena miltochristalis (Hampson, 1896)
Eusabena monostictalis (Hampson, 1899)
Eusabena paraphragma (Meyrick, 1889)
Eusabena selinialis Snellen, 1901

References

Spilomelinae
Crambidae genera
Taxa named by Pieter Cornelius Tobias Snellen